The Branford House is located in Groton, Connecticut on the campus of UConn Avery Point, which rents it out for events. Branford House was built in 1902 for Morton Freeman Plant, a local financier and philanthropist, as his summer home; he named it after his hometown of Branford, Connecticut. The house was added to the National Register of Historic Places on January 23, 1984.

History

When built in 1902, Branford Manor cost $3 million - an incredible sum of money at the time. Plant shunned the high society of Newport and chose instead the wide views of Long Island Sound available at Avery Point.

Branford House was designed by Plant's wife Nellie (who had a Sorbonne education in architecture) and built by Robert W. Gibson. Although the outside was built to the Tudor style to match the estate, the interior was a patchwork of various styles - "Gothic, Baroque, Renaissance, Classical, and even Flemish" - desired by the Plants. The house included a two-story fireplace surrounded by a clothes-drying conveyor belt, a then-rare elevator, and other architectural curiosities like doors leading into exterior walls.

Plant fancied himself a 'gentleman farmer' and built vast agricultural facilities on the grounds. These included huge greenhouses (including one to store his tropical plants during the winter), a  cow barn, poultry enclosures, and fruit and vegetable fields. Bothered by its smell, Plant bought the Quinnipiac Fertilizer Company on nearby Pine Island and replaced it with an orchard where his grandchildren played.

Plant died in 1918; the estate passed through his son then his daughter-in-law before being sold for just $55,000 at auction in 1939. The state of Connecticut soon acquired the property, and passed it to the United States Coast Guard via a quitclaim deed funded by the federal government. As a duty to that deed the Coast Guard built Avery Point Light in 1942, though it was not lit until 1944. The lavish grounds were bulldozed into the water to make room for barracks for a training center; the house became offices and executive quarters. The west wing was used as the base chapel until it was destroyed by fire in 1963.

In 1967, the property was transferred back to the state for use as a satellite campus of the University of Connecticut, though the buildings were largely in poor condition. By the 1980s the house needed millions of dollars of renovations which UConn could not afford; there was discussion of a private developer turning it into a conference center, or of the town taking over the property. The building was added to the National Register of Historic Places on January 23, 1984.

Ultimately UConn carried out renovations to the house, which were completed in 2001. The house is not in regular academic use; UConn rents it out for event uses. The second floor of the Branford House is home to the Alexey von Schlippe Gallery of Art.

See also
National Register of Historic Places listings in New London County, Connecticut

References

External links
Uconn - Branford House
Historic postcards of Branford House

Houses on the National Register of Historic Places in Connecticut
Houses completed in 1902
Houses in New London County, Connecticut
Buildings and structures in Groton, Connecticut
National Register of Historic Places in New London County, Connecticut